Csilla Elekes (born 18 June 1964) is a German handball player. She competed in the women's tournament at the 1996 Summer Olympics.

References

1964 births
Living people
German female handball players
Olympic handball players of Germany
Handball players at the 1996 Summer Olympics
Sportspeople from Budapest